Annike Berit Krahn (born 1 July 1985) is a German former footballer who played as a centre back.

Club career
Krahn started playing football at the age of four. She played at SV Westfalia Weitmar 09, SV Waldesrand Linden, TuS Harpen and SG Wattenscheid 09 at youth level, before joining FCR 2001 Duisburg in 2004. Krahn was runner-up in the Bundesliga five times with Duisburg, including four seasons in a row from 2005 to 2008. She won the German Cup twice with the club and claimed the UEFA Women's Cup with Duisburg in the 2008–09 season.

During qualification for the UEFA Women's Champions League against Glasgow City in August 2010, Krahn tore the anterior cruciate ligament in her left knee. She missed the entire 2010–11 Bundesliga season. Following the 2011–12 season she left Duisburg after eight years seeking a new challenge.

She signed a two-year contract with Paris Saint-Germain on 20 July 2012. She announced that she would leave Paris at the end of the 2014–15 season.

She joined Bayer Leverkusen at the start of the 2015–16 season.

On 10 May 2017, she announced her retirement at the end of the 2016–17 season.

International career
In 2004, Krahn was runner-up with Germany at the 2004 UEFA Women's U-19 Championship and later that year won the 2004 FIFA U-19 Women's World Championship. She made her debut for the German senior national team in a friendly match against Australia in January 2005. The 2007 FIFA Women's World Cup was Krahn's first major tournament. Initially a reserve player, she started for Germany in the second group match against England after veteran Sandra Minnert got injured. Alongside Kerstin Stegemann, Ariane Hingst and Linda Bresonik, Krahn was part of Germany's defence which did not concede a single goal in the entire tournament.

One year later, she won the bronze medal at the 2008 Summer Olympics and she was part of Germany's team winning the country's seventh title at the 2009 European Championship. Krahn has been called up for Germany's 2011 FIFA Women's World Cup squad.

She was part of the squad for the 2016 Summer Olympics, where Germany won the gold medal.

She retired from international football on 23 August 2016.

Career statistics
Scores and results list Germany's goal tally first:

Source:

Honours
FCR 2001 Duisburg
German Cup: 2008–09, 2009–10; runner-up 2006–07
UEFA Women's Cup: 2008–09

Germany
FIFA Women's World Cup: 2007
UEFA Women's Championship: 2009, 2013
Summer Olympic Games: Bronze medal 2008, Gold medal 2016

Germany U20
FIFA U-19 Women's World Championship: 2004

Germany U19
UEFA Women's U-19 Championship: runner-up 2004
Algarve Cup: 2006, 2012, 2014

Individual
Silbernes Lorbeerblatt: 2007, 2016
UEFA Women's Championship All-Star Team: 2013

References

External links
  
 Profile  at DFB
 Player German domestic football stats  at DFB
 
 
 
 
 

1985 births
Living people
Sportspeople from Bochum
German women's footballers
FCR 2001 Duisburg players
Paris Saint-Germain Féminine players
Bayer 04 Leverkusen (women) players
Germany women's international footballers
2007 FIFA Women's World Cup players
2011 FIFA Women's World Cup players
2015 FIFA Women's World Cup players
Footballers at the 2008 Summer Olympics
Footballers at the 2016 Summer Olympics
Olympic footballers of Germany
Olympic gold medalists for Germany
Olympic bronze medalists for Germany
Olympic medalists in football
Medalists at the 2008 Summer Olympics
Medalists at the 2016 Summer Olympics
FIFA Women's World Cup-winning players
FIFA Century Club
Women's association football defenders
German expatriate women's footballers
German expatriate sportspeople in France
Expatriate women's footballers in France
UEFA Women's Championship-winning players
Division 1 Féminine players
Footballers from North Rhine-Westphalia